Best Of is a compilation album by popular Greek singer Despina Vandi containing some of her most successful singles under the EMI Music Greece label (with whom she was signed from her debut in 1994 until 2000). It was a promotional offer of "Ependisi" newspaper on May 29, 2015.

Track listing

Release history

Credits and personnel

Personnel
Panagiotis Apostolidis - music
Panos Falaras - lyrics
Natalia Germanou - lyrics
Makis Giaprakas - music
Vasilis Karras - music, lyrics
Lazaros Komninos - lyrics
Tony Kontaxakis - music, lyrics
Giorgos Lembesis - vocals
Lambis Livieratos - lyrics
Christoforos Mpalampanidis - lyrics
Christos Nikolopoulos - music
Yiannis Parios - vocals, lyrics
Phoebus - music, lyrics
Ercan Saatçi - music
Despina Vandi - vocals

Production
Christos Nikolopoulos - Seed Point Music Publishing
Dimitris Panagiotakopoulos - artwork
Ioanna Tzetzoumi - photo

Credits adapted from the album's liner notes.

References

External links
 Official site

2015 compilation albums
Despina Vandi compilation albums
Greek-language compilation albums
Minos EMI compilation albums